The IAR-824 (originally known as the ICA IS-24) was a utility aircraft built in Romania in the 1970s.

Development
Developed from the ICA IS-23A, it was a conventional high-wing cantilever monoplane of all-metal construction with fixed tricycle undercarriage and seating for six people within an enclosed cabin.

Production
The first prototype made its maiden flight on 23 May 1971 with the type gaining its type certificate on 13 May 1972. It was exhibited at the 1973 Paris Air Show. Ten examples were built, including the prototype, some of which were fitted with a tailwheel undercarriage for glider towing, with five going to Romania's Aeroclub for training and glider towing.

Aircraft on display

The aircraft with construction number 5 and registration YR-ISF is on display at the Clinceni Airfield near Bucharest.

Specifications

See also

References

 
 
  
 
 Уголок неба

1970s Romanian civil utility aircraft
824
ICA aircraft
Aircraft first flown in 1971
High-wing aircraft
Single-engined tractor aircraft